In the Round is a Canadian music variety television series which aired on CBC Television in 1970.

Premise
This Vancouver-produced music series featured regulars Mike Neun, Carol Hunter and the Doug Parker Quartet. As the series title suggests, the hosts and their guests were arranged in a circular pattern in the studio.

Scheduling
This half-hour series was broadcast on Sundays at 2:00 p.m. (Eastern) from 19 April to 28 June 1970.

References

External links
 

CBC Television original programming
1970 Canadian television series debuts
1970 Canadian television series endings